Fox River Airport , is a public use airport located  northwest of the central business district of Rochester, a city in Racine County, Wisconsin, United States.

Although most U.S. airports use the same three-letter location identifier for the FAA and IATA, this airport is assigned 96C by the FAA but has no designation from the IATA.

Facilities and aircraft 
It has one runway: 1/19 is 2,500 by 36 feet (762 x 11 m), with an asphalt surface.

For the 12-month period ending May 5, 2021, the airport had 5,000 aircraft operations, an average of 13 per day: 100% general aviation. In January 2023, there were no aircraft based at this airport.

See also
List of airports in Wisconsin

References

External links 
 

Airports in Wisconsin
Buildings and structures in Racine County, Wisconsin
Airports in Racine County, Wisconsin